Vocational Rehabilitation and Employment (Disabled Persons) Convention, 1983 is  an International Labour Organization Convention.

It was established in 1983, with the preamble stating:
Having decided upon the adoption of certain proposals with regard to vocational rehabilitation...

Ratifications 
As of 2022, the treaty has been ratified by 85 states.

References

External links 
Text
Ratifications

Disability rights
International Labour Organization conventions
Treaties concluded in 1983
Treaties entered into force in 1985
Treaties of Afghanistan
Treaties of Australia
Treaties of Azerbaijan
Treaties of Bahrain
Treaties of Belgium
Treaties of Bolivia
Treaties of Bosnia and Herzegovina
Treaties of Brazil
Treaties of Burkina Faso
Treaties of Chile
Treaties of the People's Republic of China
Treaties of Colombia
Treaties of Costa Rica
Treaties of Ivory Coast
Treaties of Croatia
Treaties of Cuba
Treaties of Cyprus
Treaties of Czechoslovakia
Treaties of the Czech Republic
Treaties of Denmark
Treaties of the Dominican Republic
Treaties of Ecuador
Treaties of Egypt
Treaties of El Salvador
Treaties of the People's Democratic Republic of Ethiopia
Treaties of Fiji
Treaties of Finland
Treaties of France
Treaties of West Germany
Treaties of Greece
Treaties of Guatemala
Treaties of Guinea
Treaties of the Hungarian People's Republic
Treaties of Iceland
Treaties of Ireland
Treaties of Italy
Treaties of Japan
Treaties of Jordan
Treaties of South Korea
Treaties of Kuwait
Treaties of Kyrgyzstan
Treaties of Lebanon
Treaties of Lithuania
Treaties of Luxembourg
Treaties of North Macedonia
Treaties of Madagascar
Treaties of Malawi
Treaties of Mali
Treaties of Malta
Treaties of Mauritius
Treaties of Mexico
Treaties of Mongolia
Treaties of Montenegro
Treaties of the Netherlands
Treaties of Nigeria
Treaties of Norway
Treaties of Pakistan
Treaties of Panama
Treaties of Paraguay
Treaties of Peru
Treaties of the Philippines
Treaties of Poland
Treaties of Portugal
Treaties of the Soviet Union
Treaties of San Marino
Treaties of São Tomé and Príncipe
Treaties of Serbia and Montenegro
Treaties of Yugoslavia
Treaties of Slovakia
Treaties of Slovenia
Treaties of Spain
Treaties of Sweden
Treaties of Switzerland
Treaties of Tajikistan
Treaties of Thailand
Treaties of Trinidad and Tobago
Treaties of Tunisia
Treaties of Turkey
Treaties of Uganda
Treaties of Ukraine
Treaties of Uruguay
Treaties of Vietnam
Treaties of Yemen
Treaties of Zambia
Treaties of Zimbabwe
Treaties of Argentina
Treaties extended to the Faroe Islands
Treaties extended to Greenland
Vocational rehabilitation
1983 in labor relations